The A7 or otherwise known as the North motorway, is a motorway in Luxembourg. It links the capital city with the North of the country

Status
The entire A7 opened on the 23 September 2015 at 8 P.M.
The complete motorway is 31.468 km long.

All of the eight planned sections of the A7 are in service:
 10 November 1989: Ettelbruck - Erpeldange
 29 July 1993: Schieren - Ettelbruck
 August 1996:  Erpeldange - Fridhaff
 16 November 2001: Schoenfels - Mierscherbierg
 16 November 2001: Mierschbierg - Schieren
 13 September 2002: Grunewald - Waldhof
 24 January 2008: Lorentzweiler - Schoenfels
 23 September 2015: Waldhof - Lorentzweiler

Route

References

External links

Motorways in Luxembourg